Verónica Beatriz Juárez Piña (born 28 September 1971) is a Mexican politician affiliated with the PRD. She has served as Deputy of the LXII Legislature of the Mexican Congress representing Jalisco since 2013.

References

1971 births
Living people
People from Tlaquepaque
Politicians from Jalisco
Women members of the Chamber of Deputies (Mexico)
Party of the Democratic Revolution politicians
21st-century Mexican politicians
21st-century Mexican women politicians
Deputies of the LXII Legislature of Mexico
Members of the Chamber of Deputies (Mexico) for Jalisco